Dikyamaç can refer to:

 Dikyamaç, Arhavi
 Dikyamaç, Kemah
 Dikyamaç Museum